Serine/threonine-protein kinase Sgk3 is an enzyme that in humans is encoded by the SGK3 gene.

Function 

This gene is a member of the serine/threonine protein kinase family and encodes a phosphoprotein with a PX (phox homology) domain. The protein phosphorylates several target proteins and has a role in neutral amino acid transport and activation of potassium and chloride channels. Alternate transcriptional splice variants, encoding different isoforms, have been characterized.

In melanocytic cells SGK3 gene expression may be regulated by MITF.

Interactions 

SGK3 has been shown to interact with GSK3B.

References

Further reading 

 
 
 
 
 
 
 
 
 
 
 
 
 
 
 

EC 2.7.11